Kenya Karasawa (唐澤 剣也, Karasawa Kenya, born 3 July 1994) is a visually impaired Japanese Paralympic long-distance runner. He represented Japan at the 2020 Summer Paralympics.

He was born in Gumna Prefecture, Japan. Domestically, he competes for the Subaru Track and Field Team.

Career
Karasawa represented Japan in the 5000 m T11 event at the 2020 Summer Paralympics and won a silver medal.

References 

1994 births
Living people
Japanese male long-distance runners
Paralympic athletes of Japan
Paralympic athletes with a vision impairment
Medalists at the World Para Athletics Championships
Athletes (track and field) at the 2020 Summer Paralympics
Medalists at the 2020 Summer Paralympics
Paralympic silver medalists for Japan
Paralympic medalists in athletics (track and field)
Sportspeople from Gunma Prefecture
Japanese blind people